The Abingdon Chronicle may refer to:

 Manuscripts B and C of the Anglo-Saxon Chronicle
 Historia Ecclesie Abbendonensis, a 12th-century Latin chronicle written at Abingdon